Nataliya Sorokina (born 7 June 1976) is a Russian swimmer. She competed in the women's 4 × 100 metre freestyle relay event at the 1996 Summer Olympics.

References

1976 births
Living people
Russian female swimmers
Olympic swimmers of Russia
Swimmers at the 1996 Summer Olympics
Place of birth missing (living people)
Russian female freestyle swimmers